CKLZ-FM is a Canadian radio station, broadcasting at 104.7 FM in Kelowna, British Columbia. The station, owned by the Jim Pattison Group, broadcasts a mainstream rock format branded as 104.7 The Lizard.

References

External links
 104.7 The Lizard
 
 

KLZ
KLZ
KLZ
Radio stations established in 1964
1964 establishments in British Columbia